Frøystein Wedervang (14 March 1918 – 8 May 2018) was a Norwegian economist.

He was born in Hedrum as a son of Ingvar Wedervang. He graduated with the siv.øk. degree from the Norwegian School of Economics in 1940 and the cand.oecon. degree from the University of Oslo in 1943. Following the dr.philos. degree in 1957 he worked as a docent in business administration from 1958 to 1964 and economics from 1965 to 1985, both at the Norwegian School of Economics.

References

1918 births
2018 deaths
People from Larvik
Norwegian School of Economics alumni
University of Oslo alumni
Academic staff of the Norwegian School of Economics
Norwegian economists
Norwegian centenarians
Men centenarians